William Alford Richards (March 9, 1849July 25, 1912) was an American surveyor, rancher and politician. He was the fourth Governor of Wyoming from January 7, 1895 until January 2, 1899; and also served as the 30th Commissioner of the General Land Office from 1903 to 1907.

Biography
Richards was born in Hazel Green, in Grant County, Wisconsin, and educated there and in Galena, Illinois. During the Civil War he served as an ambulance driver for the Army of the Potomac.

Career
As a young man Richards worked on surveying missions in Nebraska, and first came to Wyoming in 1873 when his brother Alonzo V. Richards hired him as his general assistant while surveying the southern boundary of Wyoming Territory.

The next year they returned for the survey of the western boundary of Wyoming. Alonzo left the expedition after 99 miles, leaving William in charge of completing the survey. William moved to California, to marry Harriet Alice Hunt in 1874. The couple had three daughters. In 1885 he returned to Wyoming, homesteading a ranch in Big Horn County.  In 1886, he was elected county commissioner of Johnson County, and in 1889 President Harrison appointed him Surveyor General for Wyoming.

In 1894, Richards ran for governor on the Republican ticket.  He defeated William H. Holliday and Lewis C. Tidball, becoming the state's third elected governor. He served as governor from 1895 to 1899.  Though he helped defuse the Jackson Hole Indian Crisis of 1895, Richards is also known for pardoning Butch Cassidy. Then a small-time rustler, Cassidy was serving a two-year term in the State Penitentiary for possession of a stolen horse worth only $5. Citizens of Fremont County, fearing Cassidy's return, asked the governor for a pardon in hopes it "would have much to do in causing him to become a law-abiding citizen," Richards wrote to a concerned rancher, Jay Torrey. Richards had interviewed Butch at the Penitentiary and pardoned him after hearing reassuring words from the prisoner. Cassidy "told me that he had [had] enough of Penitentiary life," Richards told Torrey, "and intended to conduct himself in such a way as to not again lay himself liable to arrest." What he may have meant was, he intended to not again get caught.

At the conclusion of his term he was replaced by DeForest Richards (a very distant cousin), also a Republican, and was appointed assistant commissioner of the General Land Office. William A. Richards opened the Apache, Comanche, and Wichita Indian Reservations in Oklahoma to settlement.

In 1903, Richards was appointed Commissioner of the General Land Office by President Theodore Roosevelt, serving until 1907. During his tenure he helped save Indian ruins and other important monuments from damage and destruction by asking Edgar L. Hewett of New Mexico for a list of sites that should be protected. Hewett sent back a Memorandum that listed Mesa Verde, Chaco Canyon and many others, and Richards had it published as a Circular. The memorandum was a step toward the passage of the Antiquites Act of 1906, which has been used by American presidents to set aside innumerable National Monuments.

In 1909 Richards became the first Commissioner for Taxation for the state of Wyoming, holding the post until a change in administration a year later. In 1912, he traveled to Melbourne, Australia, to start a new life after the violent deaths of his daughter Edna and her husband, Thomas Jenkins.

Death
Richards died of a heart attack soon after his arrival in Australia, in July 1912. He had attended an honorary banquet for his old friend Elwood Mead, former State Engineer of Wyoming, who was then in charge of developing irrigation in that country. Mead accompanied Richards's body home across the ocean. Richards is interred at Lakeview Cemetery, in Cheyenne, Wyoming.

References

External links
Wyoming Cadastral Survey Richards bioBureau of Land Management Wyoming
State biographyWyoming State Archives, Wyoming Blue Book Wiki
 at Nebraska State Historical Society

National Governors Association
The Political Graveyard
"A Surveyor in the Governor's Office: William A. Richards", Wyoming Postscripts. March 9, 2015. Retrieved 22 January 2016.
Governor William A. Richards papers, RG0001.14, Wyoming State Archives. 

1849 births
1912 deaths
Governors of Wyoming
People of Wisconsin in the American Civil War
People from Hazel Green, Wisconsin
General Land Office Commissioners
Wisconsin Republicans
Republican Party governors of Wyoming
19th-century American politicians